Gustaf is an American art punk band from Brooklyn, New York.

History
The group formed in 2018. In 2020, the band released two songs, "Mine" and "Design". In 2021, the band released their debut album, Audio Drag for Ego Slobs, through Royal Mountain Records.

Discography
Studio albums
Audio Drag for Ego Slobs (2021, Royal Mountain Records)

References

Royal Mountain Records artists
American art rock groups